Known as the Palomino Express, Kaweah Bar (1966 - 1976) racked up impressive stats on the Quarter Horse racetracks.

Life

Kaweah Bar was the son of Alamitos Bar and out of Angie Miss. Alamitos Bar was a son of Three Bars (TB). Kaweah Bar's dam was a daughter of Go Man Go.

Racing career 
From 101 starts in eight years, Kaweah Bar won thirty-six races, coming in second seventeen times and third twelve times. He earned an American Quarter Horse Association (or AQHA) Race Register of Merit with his highest Speed Index of 102. He earned 273 racing points from the AQHA, entitling him to the title of Superior Race Horse. He was named the World Champion Quarter Running Horse in both 1968 and 1970, with Champion Quarter Running Gelding titles in 1969, 1971 and 1972. In total, he earned $374,577.00 on the racetrack.

Post racing career and death 
His owner retired him from the track and he was sold as a chariot horse. In late 1976, he died in a trailer accident. Los Alamitos Race Course in Los Alamitos, California, holds the Kaweah Bar Handicap annually to honor the horse.

Honors 
Kaweah Bar was inducted into the AQHA Hall of Fame in 1998.

Notes

References

 All Breed Pedigree Database Pedigree of Kaweah Bar retrieved on July 4, 2007
 AQHA Hall of Fame accessed on September 1, 2017

External links
 Kaweah Bar at Quarter Horse Directory
 Kaweah Bar at Quarter Horse Legends

American Quarter Horse racehorses
1966 racehorse births
AQHA Hall of Fame (horses)